Pygmalion and Galatea are two characters from Greco-Roman mythology.

Pygmalion and Galatea may also refer to:
 Pygmalion and Galatea (play), a play by W. S. Gilbert
 Pygmalion and the Image series, a series of paintings by Edward Burne-Jones
 Pygmalion and Galatea (Gérôme painting), a painting by Jean-Léon Gérôme
 Pygmalion and Galatea (film), a 1898 film by Georges Méliès

See also
 Galatea, or Pygmalion Reversed,  a musical parody on Gilbert's play Pygmalion and Galatea, by Henry Pottinger Stephens and Meyer Lutz